The 2017 South American Youth Games, also known as the II South American Youth Games, were a multi-sport event celebrated in Santiago, Chile. All 14 National Olympic Committees (NOCs) of the ODESUR were expected to compete.

Bids
The election of the host for the South American Youth Games of 2017 was announced during the General Assembly of ODESUR between the 23 and 27 of March 2015.

  Santiago: Chile postulated for the Youth Games with a sports program that contemplates 20 sports and that would take place between the 21 and the 30 of October 2017. As established in the Manual of Candidature of the South American Sports Organization - ODESUR, the COCh sent the dossier of candidacy that expired on January 16, accompanied by the letter of President Michelle Bachelet, the Minister of Sports, Natalia Riffo, the Mayor of the Metropolitan Region, Claudio Orrego and the head of the Chilean Olympic Committee , Neven Ilic. The same venues and the infrastructure of the 2014 South American Games will be used.
  Asunción: The Paraguayan Olympic Committee proposed the organization of the II South American Youth Games.

  La Paz: The Director of Sports of La Paz announced the nomination to organize the South American Youth Games.
  Popayán or  Tunja: The Colombian Olympic Committee proposed the organization of the II South American Youth Games. For this, two cities were launched as candidates to host the event.

Sports

 Aquatics
 
 
 
 
 
 
 
 
 
 
 
 
 
 
 
 
 
 
 
 
 
 
 
 
 
 Freestyle (10)
 Greco-Roman (5)

Participating teams
All 15 nations of the Organización Deportiva Suramericana (ODESUR) are expected to compete in these Youth Games.

https://es.wikipedia.org/wiki/Juegos_Suramericanos_de_la_Juventud_de_2017

  (150)
  (11)
  (50)
  (149)
  (208)
  (137)
  (129)
 

Medal table

Key
 Host nation (Chile)

References 

 
South American Youth Games
Youth
2017 in Chilean sport
2010s in Santiago, Chile
Sports competitions in Santiago
International sports competitions hosted by Chile
September 2017 sports events in South America
Youth Games
2017 in multi-sport events